Catoptria maculalis is a species of moth in the family Crambidae. It is found in Germany, Poland, the Czech Republic, Slovakia, Switzerland, Austria, Italy, Fennoscandia, Russia, Quebec, Labrador and the Yukon.

The moth's wingspan is 18–23 mm. The forewings are dark chocolate brown with two light blotches. The hindwings are dark chocolate brown without a blotch. Adults are on wing in July in North America and in June and July in northern Europe.

References 

Moths described in 1839
Crambini
Moths of Europe
Moths of North America